Hollie Johnston Dykes (born 12 September 1990) is a retired Australian gymnast who was born in Gold Coast, Queensland, and began gymnastics at the age of four and a half. She started training at the Australian Institute of Sport (Canberra) in 1998 and was awarded a full scholarship there in 2000.

Hollie made her major international debut at the 2006 Commonwealth Games in Melbourne. She won gold in the women's floor exercise and as part of the women's team final. She earned a silver in the women's beam and a bronze in the women's all-around, beating Imogen Cairns of England.

Later that year, Dykes competed in the World Championships in Aarhus, Denmark. She helped the Australian team to a respectable sixth-place finish, an improvement on the eight place in the 2004 Olympics. However, a fall from beam in qualification rounds left her unable to progress to the apparatus final, where she was a medal prospect. In the all-around, Dykes was one of only half a dozen gymnasts not to fall, but she still finished out of the medals, in seventh place.

Hollie announced her retirement from gymnastics on 11 January 2008, citing personal reasons.

Her younger brother Lyndon Dykes is a professional footballer who plays for Queens Park Rangers and the Scotland national team.

References

External links
 
 Hollie Dykes at Gymnastics Australia
 

1990 births
Living people
Australian Institute of Sport gymnasts
Australian female artistic gymnasts
Australian people of Scottish descent
Sportspeople from the Gold Coast, Queensland
Gymnasts at the 2006 Commonwealth Games
Commonwealth Games gold medallists for Australia
Commonwealth Games silver medallists for Australia
Commonwealth Games bronze medallists for Australia
Commonwealth Games medallists in gymnastics
20th-century Australian women
21st-century Australian women
Sportswomen from Queensland
Medallists at the 2006 Commonwealth Games